The following is a list of sports history organizations.

Sports

Athletics Track & Field 

Association of Track and Field Statisticians

Baseball 
Society for American Baseball Research

Basketball 
Association for Professional Basketball Research

American football 
Professional Football Researchers Association

Association football 
English National Football Archive
International Federation of Football History & Statistics
Rec.Sport.Soccer Statistics Foundation

Canadian football 
Canadian Football Historical Association

Ice hockey 
Hockey Research Association
Society for International Hockey Research

Olympic Games 
International Society of Olympic Historians

General sports 
H.J. Lutcher Stark Center for Physical Culture and Sports at The University of Texas at Austin
North American Society for Sport History

References 

 Sports history
Sport-related lists